Uppadine Cycles was a British manufacturer of bicycles from the 1940s until the early 1970s. They were located in Doncaster. Models included traditional road bicycles and a tandem.

References 

Defunct cycle manufacturers of the United Kingdom